The following is a list of awards, honors, and nominations received by American actress and producer Frances McDormand. Among her numerous accolades for acting and producing, McDormand has won a Tony Award, two Primetime Emmy Awards (one for acting, one for producing), and four Academy Awards (three for acting, one for producing), making her one of the few performers to achieve the "Triple Crown of Acting." Additionally, she has received two Golden Globe Awards (one for acting, one for producing), three British Academy Film Awards (two for acting, one for producing), and four Screen Actors Guild Awards.

McDormand has received eight Academy Award nominations, winning Best Actress for Fargo (1996), Three Billboards Outside Ebbing, Missouri (2017), and Nomadland (2020). As one of the producers of Nomadland, she also won the Best Picture. Her wins for Nomadland made her the first person in history to win Academy Awards both as producer and performer for the same film, the second woman in history to win Best Actress three times, and the seventh performer overall to win three competitive acting Academy Awards. McDormand has also received Academy Award nominations in five consecutive decades, beginning in 1989 for Mississippi Burning (1988), which earned her a nomination for Best Supporting Actress, which she lost to Geena Davis for The Accidental Tourist (1988).

McDormand has received three Primetime Emmy Award nominations, her first coming in 1997 for Outstanding Supporting Actress in a Limited Series or Television Movie for Hidden in America (1996). For her performance in the HBO miniseries Olive Kitteridge (2014), McDormand won the Outstanding Lead Actress in a Limited Series or Movie in 2015. As one of the miniseries producers, she also won Outstanding Limited or Anthology Series. McDormand has been twice nominated for the Tony Award for Best Actress in a Play, in 1989 for A Streetcar Named Desire (1988) and in 2012 for Good People (2011), winning for the latter.

Major industry awards

Academy Awards

BAFTA Awards

Emmy Awards

Golden Globe Awards

Independent Spirit Awards

Screen Actors Guild Awards

Tony Awards

Other industry awards

American Comedy Awards

Australian Academy of Cinema and Television Arts Awards

British Independent Film Awards

Drama Desk Awards

Gotham Awards

Irish Film & Television Drama Academy Awards

National Board of Review

Producers Guild of America

Satellite Awards

Saturn Awards

Critics awards

African-American Film Critics Association Awards

Atlanta Film Critics Circle Awards

Austin Film Critics Association Awards

Black Film Critics Circle Awards

Boston Society of Film Critics Awards

Boston Online Film Critics Association Awards

Central Ohio Film Critics Association Awards

Chicago Film Critics Association Awards

Chicago Indie Critics Awards

Columbus Film Critics Association

Critics' Choice Movie Awards

Critics' Choice Television Awards

Dallas-Fort Worth Film Critics Association Awards

Denver Film Critics Society

Detroit Film Critics Society Awards

DiscussingFilm Critics Awards

Dublin Film Critics' Circle

Florida Film Critics Circle Awards

Georgia Film Critics Association Awards

Hollywood Critics Association Awards

Houston Film Critics Society

Kansas City Film Critics Circle

Las Vegas Film Critics Society Awards

London Film Critics' Circle Awards

Los Angeles Film Critics Association Awards

National Society of Film Critics Awards

New York Film Critics Circle Awards

North Carolina Film Critics Association Awards

North Texas Film Critics Association Awards

Online Film Critics Society Awards

Outer Critics Circle Awards

Phoenix Film Critics Society Awards

San Diego Film Critics Society Awards

San Francisco Film Critics Circle Awards

Seattle Film Critics Society Awards

Society of Texas Film Critics Awards

Southeastern Film Critics Association Awards

St. Louis Gateway Film Critics Association Awards

Toronto Film Critics Association Awards

Utah Film Critics Association Awards

Vancouver Film Critics Circle Awards

Washington D.C. Area Film Critics Association Awards

Women Film Critics Circle Awards

Other awards and honors

AARP Movies for Grownups Awards

Alliance of Women Film Awards

Awards Circuit Community Awards

Behind The Voice Acting Feature Film Voice Acting Awards

Black Reel Awards

Blockbuster Entertainment Awards

CinEuphoria Awards

Dorian Awards

Elle Magazine Awards

Empire Awards

Gijón International Film Festival

International Cinephile Society Awards

Lone Star Film and Television Awards

North Dakota Film Society Awards

Online Film and Television Association Awards

Venice Film Festival

See also
 Frances McDormand on screen and stage 
 Triple Crown of Acting

Notes

References

External links
 

McDormand, Frances